Recto is a surname. Notable people with the surname include:
Claro M. Recto (1890–1960), Filipino politician
Rafael Recto (1931–2008), Filipino sports shooter
Ralph Recto (born 1964), Filipino politician
Vilma Santos-Recto (born 1953), Filipina actress

Tagalog-language surnames